was a town located in Kashima District, Ishikawa Prefecture, Japan.

In 2003, the town had an estimated population of 5,576 and a population density of 206.52 per km². The total area was 27.00 km².

On March 1, 2005, Toriya, along with the towns of Kashima and Rokusei (all from Kashima District), was merged to create the town of Nakanoto.

External links
 Official website of Nakanoto in Japanese

Dissolved municipalities of Ishikawa Prefecture
Nakanoto, Ishikawa